Paul Henry Hopkins (September 25, 1904 – January 2, 2004) was a right-handed relief pitcher in Major League Baseball who played for the Washington Senators (1927, 1929) and St. Louis Browns (1929).

Hopkins was born in Chester, Connecticut. His major league debut came on the same day that Babe Ruth hit his record-tying 59th home run on September 29, 1927. Hopkins said he did not know that he would be facing Ruth when he entered the game in the fifth inning with the bases loaded. He finished his career with a record of 1–1, 11 strikeouts, and a 2.96 earned run average in 11 games; he left St. Louis following the 1929 season after injuring a tendon.

Hopkins died in Deep River, Connecticut, at 99 years of age, having worked for the University of Illinois' RSC division for years. At the time of his death, he was the oldest living former major league player.

Quotation
"Then he (Babe Ruth) strolled out from the Yankee bench and walked up to the plate. I was not excited or awed." – Paul Hopkins in The Hartford Courant (1998).

References

External links

1904 births
2004 deaths
Baseball players from Connecticut
Colgate Raiders baseball players
Major League Baseball pitchers
St. Louis Browns players
Washington Senators (1901–1960) players
People from Chester, Connecticut